Patricia Wartusch was the defending champion, but lost in the second round to Anastasia Rodionova.

Rita Grande won the title in an all-Italian final.

Seeds

  Virginie Razzano (first round)
  Rita Grande (champion)
  Henrieta Nagyová (quarterfinals)
  Flavia Pennetta (withdrew)
  Klára Koukalová (second round)
  Patricia Wartusch (second round)
  Iveta Benešová (first round)
  Cristina Torrens Valero (second round) 
  Conchita Martínez Granados (first round)

Draw

Finals

Top half

Bottom half

References

2003 WTA Tour
Morocco Open
2003 in Moroccan tennis